This is the complete list of African Games medalists in men's athletics from 1965 to 2015.

100 metres

200 metres

400 metres

800 metres

1500 metres

5000 metres

10000 metres

Marathon

Half-marathon

3000 metre steeplechase

110 metres hurdles

400 metres hurdles

High jump

Pole vault

Long jump

Triple jump

Shot put

Discus throw

Hammer throw

Javelin throw

Decathlon

20 km road walk

4 × 100 metres relay

4 × 400 metres relay

References
All-Africa Games medal winners up to 2003

African Games
African Games